Ricky Sings Again is the third rock and roll album by Ricky Nelson, released in 1959.  The Jordanaires provide vocal accompaniment.

Track listing
"It's Late" (Dorsey Burnette) - 1:59  
"One of These Mornings"  (Dorsey Burnette) - 1:54  
"Believe What You Say" (Dorsey Burnette, Johnny Burnette) - 2:05
"Lonesome Town" (Baker Knight) - 2:14  
"Tryin' to Get to You" (Rose Marie McCoy, Charlie Singleton) - 2:15  
"Be True to Me" (James Kirkland, Nat Stuckey) - 2:23  
"Old Enough to Love" (Al Jones, Bill Jones, Merle Kilgore) - 2:17  
"Never Be Anyone Else But You" (Baker Knight) - 2:16
"I Can't Help It (If I'm Still in Love with You)" (Hank Williams) - 2:20  
"You Tear Me Up" (Baker Knight) - 2:21  
"It's All in the Game" (Charles Dawes, Carl Sigman) - 1:58  
"Restless Kid" (Johnny Cash) - 1:57

1959 albums
Ricky Nelson albums
Imperial Records albums